The Cooper neighborhood (part of the larger Longfellow community) resides along the west shore of the Mississippi River in south Minneapolis. It is bound by 34th St. E. on the south, 38th Ave. S. on the west, 27th St. E. on the north, and the river gorge to the east. Bordering neighborhoods are Seward to the north, Longfellow to the west, and Howe to the south. St. Paul's Merriam Park neighborhood is just across the Mississippi River to the east.

Cooper was named after the 19th-century author James Fenimore Cooper, best known for writing The Last of the Mohicans (1832).

Geography 
The Mississippi River Gorge is unique to this stretch of the entire Mississippi. The river cut an eighty-plus foot gorge as what is now St. Anthony Falls moved upstream over thousands of years, finally stopping at downtown Minneapolis due to engineering work during the city's flour milling boom times. Today, the Mississippi River Gorge is a protected natural landscape.

Schools 
2005 marked the closing of Cooper Elementary School, forcing Cooper's children to move to the neighboring Longfellow Elementary, which itself closed in 2010. The current elementary school for Cooperites is the Hiawatha-Howe dual campus. Minneapolis Public Schools has committed to renovating and re-opening Cooper's school for the 2017-18 school year.

Sanford Middle School (formerly Jr. High) is the closest middle school, and is located in the Howe neighborhood to the south.

South High School is the closest senior high school, and is located in the Corcoran neighborhood further to the west.

Minnehaha Academy's high school (private) is located along West River Road. The middle school is further south on West River Road in the Howe neighborhood.

Political representation 
Cooper is represented by the following people:
 City Council (2nd Ward): Cam Gordon
 Minneapolis Park Board (3rd Precinct): Scott Vreeland
 Minneapolis Mayor:[ Jacob Frey
 Hennepin County Commissioner: Angela Conley
 Minnesota House of Representatives (District 62A): Jim Davnie
 Minnesota Senate (District 62): Patricia Torres Ray
 US House of Representatives Ilhan Omar

Notable residents 
 Jesse Ventura - former Minnesota Governor; grew up in the house on the southwest corner of 32nd St. E. and 46th Ave. S.

See also
 Neighborhoods of Minneapolis

References

External links
 Street map of Cooper from Google Maps

Neighborhoods in Minneapolis
Minnesota populated places on the Mississippi River